International Workers' League is a small Belgian Trotskyist party of Morenist tradition.

External links
  
 Morenist site in French

Communist parties in Belgium
International Workers League – Fourth International
Trotskyist organizations in Europe